Frank S. Ferguson (December 25, 1906 – September 12, 1978) was an American character actor with hundreds of appearances in both film and television.

Background
Ferguson was the younger of two children of W. Thomas Ferguson, a native Scottish merchant, and his American wife Annie Boynton. He grew up in his native Ferndale, California. He graduated from Ferndale Union High School in 1927. He earned a bachelor's degree in speech and drama at the University of California and a master's degree from Cornell University. He also taught at UCLA and Cornell.

As a young man, he became connected with Gilmor Brown, the founder and director of the Pasadena Community Playhouse, and became one of its first directors. He directed as well as acted in many plays there. He also taught at the Playhouse.

He made his film debut in 1939 in Gambling on the High Seas (released in 1940), and appeared in nearly 200 feature films and hundreds of TV episodes subsequently.

Career

Ferguson's best known role was as the Swedish ranch handyman, Gus Broeberg, on the CBS television series, My Friend Flicka, based on a novel of the same name. He appeared with Gene Evans, Johnny Washbrook and Anita Louise. At this time, Ferguson also portrayed the Calverton veterinarian in the first several seasons of CBS's Lassie.

In 1948, he appeared as "McDougal" – the quickly agitated owner of "McDougal's House of Horrors" – in the Universal comedy/horror film "Abbott & Costello Meet Frankenstein". In 1952, he had an uncredited role as a jailer in the film Ma and Pa Kettle at the Fair. He also appeared in episodes 149, 173, and 178 of "The Lone Ranger".

In 1952, Ferguson played the part of a music professor at Pomona College in the second of two short films starring Jascha Heifetz, produced by Rudolph Polk and Bernard Luber. The set-up was that Heifetz and his accompanist, Emanuel Bay, had visited the college in order to see a collection of music/music scores. As they are leaving, the professor catches them and asks if Heifetz will come to his class and say a few words. He does, but when there are no questions immediately, he starts to leave. Suddenly there are some questions, and then it turns into a recital.

In 1964–1965, Ferguson portrayed Pa Stockdale in the ABC-TV comedy No Time for Sergeants.

Ferguson played three different characters on The Andy Griffith Show, two different characters on Petticoat Junction, four different characters on Bonanza, four different characters on Perry Mason (including three episodes as a sheriff), and four different characters on the ABC/WB western, Maverick. He guest starred on other series, including the syndicated Gunsmoke, Rescue 8, Bat Masterson, Whirlybirds, and The Everglades; NBC's The Restless Gun, Riverboat, Overland Trail, National Velvet, and Mr. Novak; ABC's The Real McCoys, The Rifleman, The Alaskans, Target: The Corruptors, The Asphalt Jungle, and Mr. Smith Goes to Washington; and CBS's General Electric Theater (hosted by Ronald W. Reagan), and The Texan, starring Rory Calhoun. Ferguson appeared twice in 1956 as Henry Murdock (a name similar to his character in The Pride of the Family) on the syndicated western-themed crime drama, Sheriff of Cochise.

He guest starred in all three of Rod Cameron's crime series, City Detective (1955), State Trooper (in the 1957 episode "No Blaze of Glory", the story of a presumed arson case with a surprise ending, co-starring Vivi Janiss as his wife) and Coronado 9 (1960). He also guest starred, in the role of a hobo Beaver befriends, during the final season of ABC's Leave It to Beaver sitcom in 1963.

Ferguson played the role of Eli Carson in the primetime ABC serial Peyton Place and reprised the role in the later daytime version Return to Peyton Place. Ferguson also appeared in an episode of Green Acres in 1969.

Ferguson died in Los Angeles of cancer on September 12, 1978.

Selected filmography

 Young Tom Edison (1940) as Customer on the train (uncredited) (film debut)
 Gambling on the High Seas (1940) as City District Attorney
 Father Is a Prince (1940) as Ben Haley
 Four Mothers (1941) as Music Foundation Director (uncredited)
 Bullets for O'Hara (1941) as Prosecutor (uncredited)
 You'll Never Get Rich (1941) as Justice of the Peace (uncredited)
 Passage from Hong Kong (1941) as Ship's Doctor (uncredited)
 They Died with Their Boots On (1941) as Grant's Secretary (uncredited)
 The Body Disappears (1941) as Prof. McAuley (uncredited)
 Reap the Wild Wind (1942) as Snaith (uncredited)
 Broadway (1942) as Reporter (uncredited)
 My Gal Sal (1942) as Loud Customer (uncredited)
 This Gun for Hire (1942) as Albert Baker
 Grand Central Murder (1942) as Det. Mike McAdams (uncredited)
 Spy Ship (1942) as Burns
 Ten Gentlemen from West Point (1942) as Alden Brown
 Moonlight Masquerade (1942) as Doctor (uncredited)
 Wings for the Eagle (1942) as Hansford (uncredited)
 The War Against Mrs. Hadley (1942) as Reporter (uncredited)
 The Spirit of Stanford (1942) as Psychology Professor (uncredited)
 You Can't Escape Forever (1942) as Coroner (uncredited)
 City of Silent Men (1942) as Fred Bernard
 The Boss of Big Town (1942) as Bram Hart
 Truck Busters (1943) as George Havelock
 The Meanest Man in the World (1943) as Teller (uncredited)
 Mission to Moscow (1943) as American Newsman (uncredited)
 Pilot No. 5 (1943) as Mr. Tully (uncredited)
 Salute to the Marines (1943) as Pvt. Williams (uncredited)
 Thrill of a Romance (1945) as 1st Hotel Monte Belva Clerk (uncredited)
 Secrets of a Sorority Girl (1945) as Justin Farley
 The Dolly Sisters (1945) as Reporter at Boat Docking (uncredited)
 O.S.S. (1946) as Electronics Engineer (uncredited)
 Blonde for a Day (1946) as Walter Bronson
 The Searching Wind (1946) as Embassy Attendant (uncredited)
 Night and Day (1946) as Tina's Father (uncredited)
 Canyon Passage (1946) as Preacher (uncredited)
 Little Miss Big (1946) as Dr. Raymond (uncredited)
 If I'm Lucky (1946) as Statistician (scenes deleted)
 Lady Chaser (1946) as Attorney J. T. Vickers
 Swell Guy (1946) as Eddie (uncredited)
 Cross My Heart (1946) as Reporter (uncredited)
 The Man I Love (1947) as Army Doctor (uncredited)
 California (1947) as Cavalry Lieutenant on Patrol (uncredited)
 The Perfect Marriage (1947) as Gentleman (uncredited)
 The Beginning or the End (1947) as Dr. James B. Conant
 The Farmer's Daughter (1947) as Maatinaan
 Danger Street (1947) as Boward – Police Chief (uncredited)
 Blaze of Noon (1947) as Cash Jones (uncredited)
 Killer at Large (1947) as Edward Denton
 Welcome Stranger (1947) as Crane (uncredited)
 The Trouble with Women (1947) as Mr. Metcalfe (uncredited)
 The Perils of Pauline (1947) as Movie Theatre Owner (uncredited)
 They Won't Believe Me (1947) as Cahill
 Variety Girl (1947) as R.J. O'Connell
 Cass Timberlane (1947) as Court Clerk (uncredited)
 The Fabulous Texan (1947) as Andy Renfro (uncredited)
 T-Men (1947) as Secret Service Man (uncredited)
 Road to Rio (1947) as Texas Posse Member (uncredited)
 The Bride Goes Wild (1948) as Reporter (uncredited)
 The Inside Story (1948) as Eph – Editor of The Bugle
 The Miracle of the Bells (1948) as Dolan
 Fort Apache (1948) as Newspaperman (uncredited)
 The Hunted (1948) as Paul Harrison
 Fighting Father Dunne (1948) as M.R. Colpeck (uncredited)
 Abbott and Costello Meet Frankenstein (1948) as Mr. McDougal
 The Vicious Circle (1948) as Stark
 The Babe Ruth Story (1948) as Danny's Father (uncredited)
 The Walls of Jericho (1948) as Tom Ransome (uncredited)
 They Live by Night (1948) as Bum (uncredited)
 Walk a Crooked Mile (1948) as Carl Bemish
 Rachel and the Stranger (1948) as Mr. Green
 That Wonderful Urge (1948) as Findlay (uncredited)
 Dynamite (1949) as 'Hard Rock' Mason
 Shockproof (1949) as Logan (uncredited)
 Slightly French (1949) as Marty Freeman (uncredited)
 State Department: File 649 (1949) as Consul Reither
 Caught (1949) as Dr. Hoffman
 Homicide (1949) as Albert Murray (uncredited)
 The Barkleys of Broadway (1949) as Mr. Perkins (uncredited)
 Follow Me Quietly (1949) as J.C. McGill
 Roseanna McCoy (1949) as Ellison Hatfield
 Free for All (1949) as Hap Ross
 Dancing in the Dark (1949) as John Sharkey (uncredited)
 Key to the City (1950) as Councilman (uncredited)
 Tyrant of the Sea (1950) as Officer (uncredited)
 The Good Humor Man (1950) as Insp. Quint
 Louisa (1950) as Park Attendant (uncredited)
 The Lawless (1950) as Carl Green
 The Furies (1950) as Dr. Grieve
 Right Cross (1950) as Dr. George Esmond (uncredited)
 He's a Cockeyed Wonder (1950) as Sheriff Oliver (uncredited)
 Under Mexicali Stars (1950) as Counterfeitor Goldie
 The West Point Story (1950) as Commandant (uncredited)
 Watch the Birdie (1950) as Mr. Whittle (uncredited)
 Frenchie (1950) as Jim Dobbs
 The Great Missouri Raid (1951) as Bank Teller (uncredited)
 Santa Fe (1951) as Marshal Bat Masterson
 Thunder in God's Country (1951) as Bates
 Warpath (1951) as Marshal
 The People Against O'Hara (1951) as George (uncredited)
 The Barefoot Mailman (1951) as Doc Bethune (uncredited)
 Elopement (1951) as Pinkie's Father (uncredited)
 The Model and the Marriage Broker (1951) as Conventioneer (uncredited)
 On Dangerous Ground (1951) as Willows
 Room for One More (1952) as Steve (uncredited)
 Boots Malone (1952) as Detective Agency Head (uncredited)
 The Cimarron Kid (1952) as Prison Warden (uncredited)
 Bend of the River (1952) as Tom Grundy
 Rancho Notorious (1952) as Preacher
 Rodeo (1952) as Harry Cartwright
 The Marrying Kind (1952) as Mr. Quinn (uncredited)
 Oklahoma Annie (1952) as Eldridge Haskell
 Models Inc. (1952) as Joe Reynolds – the Banker
 The Winning Team (1952) as Sam Arrants
 Has Anybody Seen My Gal? (1952) as Edward Norton
 Wagons West (1952) as Cyrus Cook
 Ma and Pa Kettle at the Fair (1952) as Sam (uncredited)
 It Grows on Trees (1952) as John Letherby
 The Iron Mistress (1952) as Doctor (uncredited)
 Million Dollar Mermaid (1952) as Prosecutor
 Stars and Stripes Forever (1952) as Mr. Wells (scenes deleted)
 Star of Texas (1953) as Marshal Bullock
 The I Don't Care Girl (1953) as Ned (uncredited)
 The Stars Are Singing (1953) as Doorman (uncredited)
 The Blue Gardenia (1953) as Drunk Reporter (uncredited)
 Woman They Almost Lynched (1953) as Bartender (uncredited)
 The Lone Hand (1953) as Mr. Dunn the Banker
 Trouble Along the Way (1953) as Mike Edwards (uncredited)
 House of Wax (1953) as Medical Examiner (uncredited)
 The Marksman (1953) as Champ Wiley
 Powder River (1953) as Johnny Slater
 The Beast from 20,000 Fathoms (1953) as Dr. Morton
 Hannah Lee (1953) as John Britton
 So This Is Love (1953) as High School Commencement Speaker (uncredited)
 Big Leaguer (1953) as Wally Mitchell
 City of Bad Men (1953) as Easterner at Training Camp (uncredited)
 Main Street to Broadway (1953) as Mr. Cope in Fantasy Sequence
 So Big (1953) as Ed (uncredited)
 Wicked Woman (1953) as Bill Porter
 Texas Bad Man (1953) as Gil
 Dragonfly Squadron (1954) as Col. Conners (uncredited)
 Riding Shotgun (1954) as Townsman (uncredited)
 Johnny Guitar (1954) as Marshal Williams
 The Outcast (1954) as Chad Polsen
 The Shanghai Story (1954) as Mr. Haljerson
 A Star Is Born (1954) as Judge George J. Barnes (uncredited)
 Drum Beat (1954) as Mr. Dyar
 Black Tuesday (1954) as Police Inspector Hailey (uncredited)
 Young at Heart (1954) as Bartell
 The Violent Men (1955) as Mahoney (uncredited)
 Battle Cry (1955) as Mr. Hector Walker
 New York Confidential (1955) as Dr. Ludlow
 The Eternal Sea (1955) as Admiral L.D.
 City of Shadows (1955) as District Attorney Hunt
 Moonfleet (1955) as Coachman
 The McConnell Story (1955) as Mechanic
 Trial (1955) as Kiley (uncredited)
 A Lawless Street (1955) as Abe Deland (uncredited)
 At Gunpoint (1955) as Marshal George Henderson
 The Phantom Stagecoach (1957) as Joe Patterson
 The Iron Sheriff (1957) as District Attorney Holloway
 Gun Duel in Durango (1957) as Sheriff Howard
 This Could Be the Night (1957) as Mr. Shea – Landlord
 The Lawless Eighties (1957) as Owen Sutter
 Cole Younger, Gunfighter (1958) as Sheriff Ralph Wittrock
 The Light in the Forest (1958) as Harry Butler
 Terror in a Texas Town (1958) as Deacon Matt Holmes
 Man of the West (1958) as Crosscut Marshal (uncredited)
 Revolt in the Big House (1958) as Gannon's Lawyer (uncredited)
 Andy Hardy Comes Home (1958) as Mayor Benson
 The Restless Gun (1958) as Sheriff - Episode "Remember the Dead"
 The Big Night (1960) as Dave
 Raymie (1960) as Rex
 Sunrise at Campobello (1960) as Dr. Bennett
 Pocketful of Miracles (1961) as Newspaper Editor
 Hush...Hush, Sweet Charlotte (1964) as Editor
 The Quick Gun (1964) as Dan Evans
 Those Calloways (1965) as Doctor (uncredited)
 The Great Sioux Massacre (1965) as Gen. Alfred Howe Terry (final film)

References

External links
 
 

1906 births
1978 deaths
20th-century American male actors
American male film actors
American male television actors
American people of Scottish descent
Deaths from cancer in California
Male Western (genre) film actors
Male actors from California
People from Ferndale, California
People from Greater Los Angeles
Western (genre) television actors